Sjølie is a surname. Notable people with the surname include:

David Aleksander Sjølie (born 1988), Norwegian jazz guitarist
Martin Sjølie (born 1979), Norwegian songwriter and record producer
Ole Sjølie (1923–2015), Norwegian painter

Norwegian-language surnames